Egyptian Sign Language is a sign language used by members of the deaf community in Egypt.  Although there are no official statistics on the number of deaf people or the number of people who use Egyptian Sign Language as their primary language, 
Gallaudet University's library resources website quotes a 1999 estimate of 2 million hearing impaired children, while a 2007 study by the World Health Organization places the prevalence of hearing loss in Egypt at 16.02% across all age groups. Egyptian Sign Language is not formally recognized by the government. 

Linguistically, Egyptian Sign Language is not related to other sign languages of the Arab World, such as Jordanian Sign Language, Palestinian Sign Language, or Libyan Sign Language. Attempts at unification, creating an "Arabic Sign Language", have failed, as the unified form would be an entirely new language.

See also 

 Deafness in Egypt

References

External links
 Egyptian Sign Puddle – Dictionary of Egyptian Sign Language (under construction)
 YouTube ESL Dictionary – Animated Dictionary of Egyptian Sign Language (under construction)
 The Deaf Unit – Private School in Cairo, associated with The Nardine Association NGO – جمعية الناردين

Arab sign languages
Languages of Egypt